Mohammed Motin Mia, also spelled as Matin Miah, is a Bangladeshi footballer who plays as a winger or center forward. He currently plays for Bashundhara Kings in Bangladesh Premier League and the Bangladesh national team.

Club career
Motin scored 5 goals from 12 matches, won the player of the tournament award during 2016 Bangladesh Championship League, and helped his club to get promoted to Bangladesh Football Premier League.

On 5 August 2017, his solitary goal against Arambagh KS earned his club its first ever victory in a professional league game.

On 26 December 2018, Motin scored the all-important goal for his side Bashundhara Kings to lay their hands on their first silverware in top-flight football in the fifth minute of extra time of the final of the Independence Cup.

International career

U23
On 16 August 2018, Motin made his U23 debut against Thailand U-23 during 2018 Asian Games.

Senior team
On 5 October 2018, Motin made his senior debut against Philippines  during a 2018 Bangabandhu Cup match.

On 19 January 2020, Motin netted his first international goal against Sri Lanka during 2020 Bangabandhu Cup in the 17th minute after collecting a fine lob from Manik. The forward cut inside Sri Lankan defender Jude Supan at the top of the box before hitting past the keeper's gloves. The winger, who hailed from Sylhet, doubled the lead after the hour mark with a cool finish. After snatching possession from the same defender at the halfway line, Matin got only the opponent goalkeeper in front of him and he skillfully dribbled past the custodian before rolling the ball in the net.

International goals

National Team 
Scores and results list Bangladesh's goal tally first.

References

1998 births
Living people
Bangladeshi footballers
Bangladesh international footballers
Bangladesh youth international footballers
Association football forwards
Bashundhara Kings players